Omba Island is an island of Indonesia. It was written about by William Dampier in A Continuation of a Voyage to New Holland (1699):

In February 1805, the British ship Iris, under the command of Captain William Clark, intercepted and engaged a valuable Batavian vessel near Omba Island; after a fierce battle, Clarke was badly wounded and the Iris was too damaged to continue, and had to break off the engagement.

References

Islands of Indonesia